Quassinoids are degraded triterpene lactones (similar to limonoids) of the Simaroubaceae plant family grouped into C-18, C-19, C-20, C-22 and C-25 types.  The prototypical member of the group, quassin, was first described in the 19th century from plants of the genus Quassia from which it gets its name. It was isolated in 1937 and its structure elucidated in 1961.

They are a biologically potent class of natural products, possessing antimalarial, antifeedant, insecticidal, anti-inflammatory, and anticancer properties. The quassinoid bruceantin reached two separate phase II clinical trials in 1982 and 1983.

Other quassinoids include:
 Bruceanols
 Bruceolide
 Eurycomanone
 Gutolactone
 Isobrucein A
 Neoquassin
 Nigakihemiacetal A
 Quassimarin
 Samaderines
 Simalikalactones

References

External links
 
 

 
Heterocyclic compounds with 4 rings